Alamia is a surname. Notable people with the surname include:

Juan Alamia (1876–1913), American soldier who fought in the Spanish–American War 
Gennady Alamia (born 1949), Abkhazian poet, politician, and playwright
Laisa Alamia (born 1971/72), Filipino politician and lawyer